Koekkoek or Koekoek is a Dutch family name. Koekoek means "cuckoo" in Dutch.

The surname may refer to:

, a Dutch dynasty of landscape painters:

Johannes Hermanus Koekkoek (1778–1851), Dutch artist and his four sons:
(1) Barend Cornelis Koekkoek (1803–1862), Dutch landscape artist, husband of painter Elise Thérèse Koekkoek-Daiwaille; they were parents of
(1.1)  (1838–1919)
(1.2) Maria Louise Koekkoek (1840–1910) 
(2) Marinus Adrianus Koekkoek the Elder (1807–1868), Dutch artist, father of
Hendrik Pieter Koekkoek (1843–1927)
(3)  (1811–1831), Dutch artist
(4) Hermanus Koekkoek (1815–1882), Dutch artist and his four sons:
(4.1) Hermanus Koekkoek the Younger (1836–1909), Dutch artist, father of 
Stephen Robert Koekkoek (1887-1934)
(4.2) Willem Koekkoek (1839–1895), Dutch artist, father of
(4.2.1) Hermanus Willem Koekkoek (1867–1929)
(4.2.2) Marinus Adrianus Koekkoek the Younger (1873–1944)
(4.3) Johannes Hermanus Barend Koekkoek (1840–1912), Dutch artist, father of
 (1871–1956), Dutch painter
(4.4)  (1849–1909), Dutch artist

Οther people with the surname
Hendrik Koekoek (1912–1987), Dutch politician
Marieke Koekkoek (born 1989), Dutch politician
Rike Koekkoek (born 1960), German footballer
Slater Koekkoek (born 1994), Canadian hockey defenceman

References

Dutch-language surnames